Peter James Byrne (29 January 1928 – 14 May 2018) was an English actor and director.

He was born in West Ham, Essex; his father was a musician. He was educated at grammar school and trained as an actor at the Italia Conti Stage School. He made his name by playing George Dixon's son-in-law Andy Crawford in the long-running BBC Television serial Dixon of Dock Green for twenty years from 1955. He was Director of Productions for the Bournemouth Theatre Company (1965–66).

Stage appearances included Boeing Boeing, There's a Girl in My Soup, Double Edge, The Unexpected Guest. Films include Reach for the Sky and Carry On Cabby. TV appearances included Mutiny at Spithead, The New Canadians and more than 300 appearances in Dixon of Dock Green. He also made many appearances in pantomime.

In 2005, the Dixon series was revived for BBC Radio Four, but without Byrne, though he commented, "Various people have said the series was a bit cosy and the BBC seemed to be a little ashamed of it," adding that he believed it to be very underrated.

Family
Byrne was married to Renée Helen. He died at the Denville Hall nursing home on 14 May 2018, aged 90.

Cinema appearances
 The Large Rope (1953) – Jeff Stribling
 Reach for the Sky (1956) – Civilian Pilot Witnessing Bader's Crash (uncredited)
 Watch Your Stern (1960) – Sailor
 Raising the Wind (1961) – 1st Horn
 The Iron Maiden (1962) – Race Starter (uncredited)
 Carry On Cabby (1963) – Bridegroom

Television appearances
 Dixon of Dock Green (1955–1975) – Detective Andy Crawford
 Mutiny at Spithead
 The New Canadians
 Looks Familiar
 Blake's 7 (1981) – Justin
 Bread (1986–1991) – Derek
 The Pattern of Marriage
 Cinderella

Theatre appearances

 There's a Girl in My Soup
 Underground
 Boeing Boeing
 The Blue Lamp
 Caste
 Deadly Nightcap
 Move Over Mrs Markham
 Run for Your Wife
 Dick Whittington
 There's No Place Like A Home
 The Mouse Trap
 Witness for the Prosecution

Notes

References

 Byrne P: Double Edge,Yvonne Arnaud Theatre Guildford UK, 24 May – 4 June 1977
 Byrne P:The Unexpected Guest, by Agatha Christie, Yvonne Arnaud Theatre Guildford UK, 31 July – 19 August 1978

External links
 
 

1928 births
2018 deaths
English male stage actors
English male television actors
English theatre directors
People from West Ham
Alumni of the Italia Conti Academy of Theatre Arts
Male actors from London